Judgement of the Judoon is a BBC Books original novel written by Colin Brake and based on the long-running British science fiction television series Doctor Who. It features the Tenth Doctor without an official companion. It was released on 2 April 2009, alongside The Slitheen Excursion and Prisoner of the Daleks.

Synopsis
The Doctor arrives on New Memphis, specifically, a spaceport known as "Elvis the King Spaceport" which has grown into a vast city-state. It is set to open Terminal 13, but problems develop, and the Doctor faces a lockdown situation. A notorious criminal, the Invisible Assassin, is at large, and Judoon troopers are sent to apprehend him. The Doctor partners with a Judoon Commander and a teenage private detective named Nikki Jupiter. This last character is an homage to the TV series Veronica Mars, where a young girl works in her father's detective agency.

Audiobook
An unabridged audiobook was released in June 2010 on download only, read by Nicholas Briggs who provides the voices of the Judoon on the Television series.

See also

Whoniverse

References

External links
The Cloister Library - Judgement of the Judoon

2009 British novels
2009 science fiction novels
New Series Adventures
Tenth Doctor novels
Novels by Colin Brake